Birgitte Reimer (8 February 1926 – 19 April 2021) was a Danish film actress. She appeared in 17 films between 1947 and 1964. Reimer died in April 2021 at the age of 95.

Filmography

 Soldaten og Jenny (1947)
 I de lyse nætter (1948)
 Som sendt fra himlen (1951)
 Gamle guld, Det (1951)
 We Who Go the Kitchen Route (1953)
 Solstik (1953)
 Adam og Eva (1953)
 En lektion i kärlek (1954)
 Hvad vil De ha'? (1956)
 Vi som går stjernevejen (1956)
 Sommarnöje sökes (1957)
 Parasitterne (1958)
 Møde ved midnat (1958)
 Vi er allesammen tossede (1959)
 Den grønne elevator (1961)
 Oskar (1962)
 Når enden er go' (1964)

References

External links

1926 births
2021 deaths
Danish film actresses
People from Falster
20th-century Danish actresses